The Ottawa Blues Society is an organization of volunteers in Ottawa, Ontario dedicated to fostering the "appreciation, promotion, preservation and enjoyment of the blues in all of its forms". The Society sponsors an annual Blues Heart Award, awarded "to an individual or organization that has made an outstanding contribution to fostering appreciation and awareness of blues music." Past award recipients have included Mark Monahan (1999), Executive Director of the Ottawa Bluesfest, broadcaster and music historian Brian Murphy (2000), blues performer and teacher Maria Hawkins (2005) and blues performer Tony D. (2007). It also publishes a newsletter which has been cited for its music reviews in particular.

The Society is affiliated with other Blues Societies around the world, such as the Kansas City Blues Society, to which it is specifically linked.

References

External links

 Ottawa Blues Society official website

Blues Society
Canadian blues
Music of Ottawa
Blues organizations
Music organizations based in Canada